The Christopher River is a river of New Zealand, and lies just outside and immediately to the south of Nelson Lakes National Park. It flows south for  before joining the Ada River, an upper tributary of the Waiau River.

See also
List of rivers of New Zealand

References
Land Information New Zealand - Search for Place Names

Rivers of Canterbury, New Zealand
Rivers of New Zealand